Chooch may refer to:

Fictional characters
 Chooch, in Van Nuys Blvd. (film)
 Chooch, in Up the Academy
 Chooch, played by Joe Lo Truglio in Last Man Running
 Chooch, son of Shane Scully
 Choo-Choo, or Chooch, a Top Cat character
 Chooch, in Salty's Lighthouse

People
 Carlos Ruiz (baseball) (born 1979), nicknamed Chooch, a Panamanian former professional baseball catcher
 Charles "Chooch" Sergio, a member of the band Lemon Demon
 Sam Tsoutsouvas (American football) (1917–1989), nicknamed Chooch

Other uses
 "Chooch", a song on the 1955 Frank Morgan (album) by Frank Morgan
 Chooch (film), a film shot in Stamford, Connecticut